LGBT marketing is the act of marketing to LGBT (lesbian, gay, bisexual, transgender) customers, either with dedicated ads or general ads, or through sponsorships of LGBT organizations and events, or the targeted use of any other element of the marketing mix.

The LGBT market comprises a group of customers who buy goods and services from a broad range of companies across industry segments and in many countries.

History

One of the first instances of the impact of the LGBT community in the marketing world was in 1973 when Coors Brewing Company was the subject of a boycott by the LGBT community. The LGBT community joined to protest Coors' hiring practices, since Coors used a polygraph test when going through the hiring process and specifically asked an employee about their sexual orientation. Coors ignored the boycott for several years, but made some concessions in 1978, and in 1995 began several countermeasures, including dropping the questions regarding homosexuality and extending domestic partnership benefits to its LGBT employees. The company also hired Mary Cheney as a marketing representative and began advertising in The Advocate and at events such as Denver's PrideFest.

Statistics
Marketing to the gay and lesbian community faces statistical obstacles in that few credible peer-reviewed estimates of the gay and lesbian marketplace have been published. In particular, the use of non-random "convenience surveys" on attendees at gay resorts and subscribers to gay or lesbian newspapers has resulted in unreliable statistical estimates of LGBT buying power.  The exact number of gays and lesbians in a given market is generally, if not always, unknown.

However, some national governments have started to publish data that include demographics of sexual orientation from census results. In the 2000 United States Census, two questions were asked that allowed same-sex partnerships to be counted, and the Census Bureau reported that there were more than 658,000 same-sex couples heading households in the United States. In 2013, the American Marketing Association reported that 3.5% of adults in the United States identified as lesbian, gay, bisexual, and .3% of adults as transgender. At that time, the LGBT consumer market was estimated to have an overall buying power of more than  $835  billion.

Advertising categories

Major ad categories include travel, financial services, alcoholic beverages, automotive, entertainment, hair and skincare, luxury goods, pharmaceuticals, and fashion. For example, American Airlines has launched a specific LGBT-targeted vacations website. While over fifteen years old in the United States, LGBT marketing is a relatively new marketing phenomenon elsewhere in Australia and Europe, including Belgium and the Netherlands.

Many brands that have previously ignored the existence of this segment of society now increasingly target LGBT customers. In August 2006, Time magazine carried a Business article on growing interest amongst brand name advertisers in Europe to target LGBT customers.

In 2013, the Human Rights Campaign issued the Corporate Equality Index 2013, which provides a national benchmarking tool on corporate policies and practices related to LGBT employees in the United States. This is also used to determine a company's level of gay-friendliness.

Social media
Social media plays an incredibly important part in an LGBT youth's life, with Amy Adele Hassinoff stating that "a variety of studies of gay, lesbian, transgender and queer youth indicate that the internet provides an important way to connect with communities and romantic partners, find information, and gain confidence" (Hasinoff, 2012).  For marketers, this is important knowledge to possess as it suggests that LGBT marketing should place a heavy focus on the social media aspects of their campaigns.

Social marketing
A large amount of the marketing that is aimed at the LGBT community has a heavy focus on social marketing.

Social marketing is defined by Alan R. Andreasen as:
"The adaption of commercial marketing technologies... to influence the voluntary behaviour of target audiences to improve their personal welfare and that of the society of which they are a part" (Andreasen, 1994).

Put simply, social marketing's main aim is to raise awareness about a topic or issue within a community and work to change the overall opinion, attitude, or actions associated with that issue. Social marketing in a community that is as intimate and intertwined as the LGBT community is an extremely effective and important way to get messages across that really benefit the community as a whole.

Social benefits of successful LGBT marketing campaigns
The effects of a successful LGBT marketing campaign can positively impact the LGBT community in ways that make the community safer and more welcoming, which is the overall goal of social marketing. Some examples of these effects include:

Love Your Condom – New Zealand 
The New Zealand Aids Foundation (NZAF) launched the Love Your Condom (LYC) campaign in 2014 to promote the concept of safer sex through the active use of condoms and lube every time gay/bisexual men have sex. The overall goal of the campaign was to reduce the transmission of HIV in New Zealand amongst gay and bisexual men, as these were the groups that were identified as the highest at risk (Clayton-Brown, 2015).

The LYC campaign incorporates traditional media, such as billboards and print, (i.e. newspapers and magazines), along with an active social media presence and guerrilla marketing to engage with its target audience – gay/bisexual men in New Zealand.

The campaign was launched after the NZAF executive director Shaun Robinson noticed condom use amongst men who have sex with men, otherwise known as MSM, was on the decline, both in NZ and internationally (Saxton et al., 2015).

The success of the campaign can be measured through the popularity of the LYC social media channels as a part of the NZ LGBT community, and in the statistic published on the NZAF webpage that states "new HIV infection rates among MSM in NZ have dropped 12%" since the launch of LYC. (NZAF, n.d.)

Know Your Status Stage – New York 
The not-for-profit organization LifeBeat is a charity that works with the music industry to educate America's young LGBT and their allies about the realities and dangers of HIV/AIDS (LifeBeat, c2013).

In 2014 LifeBeat launched the Know Your Status Stage (KYSS) campaign to try and raise awareness for the importance of getting tested for HIV on a larger scale than ever before. The idea behind it was to hold a large scale music event with artists that were very attractive to the target audience, (LGBT aged 13–25), where the only way to receive a ticket was to take a simple HIV test. The two objectives were to get at least 167 youth to visit the testing locations and attract NYC youth who had never been tested. (Effie Worldwide, 2015)

Due to the mass followings of the artists on social media and the incorporation of traditional advertising through the use of billboards in popular areas and ads in newspapers that were popular with their target audience, the campaign went viral.

A large factor of this success is that today's youth experience a new phenomenon that has been labeled 'FOMO', or fear of missing out, as a result of social media which meant more and more of the target audience were getting tested just to attend this event (Przybylski et al., 2013).

This campaign's success was unprecedented due to the heavy online social media presence of the youth, spreading this event through word of mouth. The objective of 167 youth tested was almost tripled, and 60% of those youth tested said they had never been tested before, with 98% of those saying they would get tested again. (Effie Worldwide, 2015)

As a direct result of this campaign, numbers of youth that were educated in terms of HIV and their own status in New York City grew considerably, and therefore the LGBT community could be perceived as a safer place, as these youth were now aware of the risks involved with sex, and the consequences of unsafe sex. LifeBeat stated that "due to the impressive performance of the KYSS idea in New York, the name was registered to spread the initiative to other cities in other states with high youth HIV indices, like Florida, California, Texas and Georgia" (Effie Worldwide, 2015).

Controversies
LGBT marketing initiatives have not been without controversy both for and against them.  Coors Brewing Company was the subject of a boycott by the LGBT community starting in 1973. The boycott was initiated by labor unions to protest the company's antagonistic practices, and was later joined by African Americans, Mexicans, and the LGBT community.  The LGBT community joined to protest Coors' hiring practices – polygraph tests were often required, during which the prospective employee was asked about their sexual orientation.

Coors ignored the boycott for several years, but made some concessions in 1978, and in 1995 began several countermeasures, including dropping the questions regarding homosexuality and extending domestic partnership benefits to its LGBT employees.  The company also hired Mary Cheney as a marketing representative and began advertising in The Advocate and at events such as Denver's PrideFest.

Specialist LGBT marketing agencies in various countries provide specialized LGBT market services to companies seeking to target LGBT customers.

The tobacco and alcohol industries have marketed products directly to the LGBT+ community. In 1990, ACT-UP, an AIDS organization, boycotted Phillip Morris. Following this, other tobacco companies began funding AIDS organizations. In a 2013 study, LGBT+ participants reported statistically significant higher levels of exposure to tobacco-related content than non-LGBT+ participants. In 2010, of the sampled parades that listed sponsors, 61% of the prides were sponsored by the alcohol industry.

In a study gauging LGBT+ response to targeted marketing, researchers noted that participants, particularly non-POC, interpreted it as valuable representation.

The LGBT+ community has historically suffered from higher levels of substance abuse than non-LGBT+ individuals. As of 2013, LGBT+ youth struggle with higher levels of alcohol usage than their non-LGBT+ peers, a pattern previously seen in 1998, 2003, and 2008 data. In a 2016 study, 49.5% of LGBT+ respondents reported current cigarette smoking, while 70.2% recognized smoking endangered one's health. In 2009-2010 data from the National Adult Tobacco Survey, gay and bisexual smokers were less likely to be aware of cessation helplines than straight smokers.

Marketing campaigns focusing on lowering levels of LGBT+ substance abuse have been attempted. Break Up, an LGBT+ focused anti-smoking campaign, was met with mixed results; while a study following its implementation indicated helpline usage had increased, cessation attempts had not. In 2016, the FDA funded the This Free Life campaign to help prevent and reduce smoking among LGBT+ young adults.

Pinkwashing

"Pinkwashing" is a portmanteau compound word of the words "pink" and "whitewashing" that is used to describe a variety of marketing and political strategies aimed at promoting a product or an entity through an appeal to queer-friendliness, primarily by political or social activists. The phrase was originally coined by Breast Cancer Action to identify companies that claimed to support women with breast cancer while actually profiting from their illness.

See also 
 Commercial Closet Association
 Gay-friendly
 LGBT
 LGBT culture
 Out Now Consulting
 Pink capitalism
 Pink Dollar
 Pinkwashing
 Project SCUM
 Queerbaiting

References

External links

CommercialCloset.org – Nonprofit with worldwide LGBT marketing information.
Gay Market News – covers latest news on gay marketing
Survey Reveals Gay Spending Power
Corporate America Taking Notice of GLBT Market
Survey: Advertising Motivates Gay Consumers

LGBT and society
Marketing
Marketing by target group